Aoheng, or Penihing, is a Kayan language of East Kalimantan, Indonesia, one of several spoken by the Penan people.

References

Languages of Indonesia
Müller-Schwaner languages